The Thirteen Buddhas of Hokkaido(北海道十三仏霊場, Hokkaidō jūsan butsu reijō) are a group of 13 Buddhist sacred sites on Hokkaido, Japan. They are dedicated to the Thirteen Buddhas.

Directory

See also 

 Thirteen Buddhas

External links 
 Website directory

Buddhist temples in Hokkaido
Buddhist pilgrimage sites in Japan
Kōyasan Shingon temples